The Green Green Grass is a British sitcom.

Green Green Grass may also refer to:

 "Green Green Grass" (song), by George Ezra
 "Green, Green Grass of Home", a song popularised by Tom Jones
 Green, Green Grass of Home (album), by Tom Jones
 Green Green Grass by the River, a Taiwanese television drama

See also
 Green Grass (disambiguation)
 The Grass Is Greener (disambiguation)